Bazaar (1976–2012) was a Danish band. Their music, which featured improvisation, has been classified as world, folk and jazz.

The band was dissolved in 2012, playing their last concert in July.

Members 
Peter Bastian: bassoon, clarinet, ocarina, percussion
Anders Koppel: Hammond B-3 Orgel
Flemming Quist Møller: Congas, bongos, drums, darbuka

Discography 
Bazaar Live (1978)
Gibbon Jump (1980) 	     	  	  	
Nimbus (1983)
Gypsy Joker (1986)
En Gudedrøm (1987)
Live In Concert (1987)
Bazaar Musik (1993)
Trilogy (2006)
Vintage (2008)
Play Bazaar (2018)

External links

Sources 

Danish folk music groups
Olufsen Records artists
World music groups